Evil Stig is a 1995 studio album by Evil Stig, which was a new band formed by Joan Jett and members of The Gits for a series of benefit concerts to fund the investigation into the 1993 murder of Gits singer Mia Zapata.  The name Evil Stig is developed from Gits Live in reverse. The album was released in 1995.

Track listing
All tracks composed by Andy Kessler, Matt Dresdner, Steve Moriarty, Mia Zapata; except where indicated

"Sign of the Crab" - 2:22
"Bob (Cousin O.)" - 2:53
"Drinking Song" - 2:47
"Spear and Magic Helmet" - 2:42
"Last to Know" (Jett, Dresdner, Moriarty, Kessler, Kenny Laguna, Jim Vallance) - 3:44
"Guilt Within Your Head" - 2:23
"Whirlwind" - 3:05
"Another Shot of Whiskey" - 2:37
"Second Skin" - 2:43
"Activity Grrrl" * (Jett) - 3:28
"You Got a Problem" * (Jett, Kathleen Hanna, Desmond Child) - 3:17
"Crimson & Clover" (Tommy James, Peter Lucia Jr.) - 3:05
"Drunks" - 7:50

 *songs already recorded for Joan Jett's previous album, Pure and Simple.

References

Joan Jett And The Blackhearts Bad Reputation Nation - Evil Stig

Joan Jett albums
1995 albums
Blackheart Records albums
The Gits albums